Gerhard Anschütz (10 January 1867 in Halle (Saale) – 14 April 1948 in Heidelberg) was a noted German teacher of constitutional law and the leading commentator of the Weimar Constitution. His principal work (with Richard Thoma) is the two-volume legal encyclopedia Handbuch des deutschen Staatsrechts; his constitutional commentary saw 14 editions during the Weimar Republic.

Anschütz, a proponent of legal positivism, taught constitutional law in Tübingen (after 1899), Heidelberg (1900), Berlin (1908) and again Heidelberg (1916). A Democrat by conviction even during World War I, he resigned his teaching position in 1933 after the Nazis seized power. After World War II, he served as a consultant to the US military government and in this position was one of the fathers of the constitution of the Bundesland Hesse.

Selected literature
 Georg Meyer, Lehrbuch des Deutschen Staatsrechts, bearbeitet von Gerhard Anschütz, 6. Auflage, Leipzig, 1905
 Gerhard Anschütz: Rezension von Hugo Preuß: Das deutsche Volk und die Politik, in: Preußische Jahrbücher, S. 164, 1916
 Gerhard Anschütz und Richard Thoma (Hrsg.): Handbuch des deutschen Staatsrechts, 2 Bände, Tübingen 1932. 
 Gerhard Anschütz: Die Verfassung des Deutschen Reiches vom 11. August 1919. Ein Kommentar für Wissenschaft und Praxis, 14. Aufl., Berlin 1933
 Gerhard Anschütz, Aus meinen Leben. Erinnerungen von Gerhard Anschütz, herausgegeben und eingeleitet von Walter Pauly, Frankfurt/Main (1993)

Further reading
 Ernst Forsthoff, 'Gerhard Anschütz', Der Staat 6, 1967
 Horst Dreier, Ein Staatsrechtslehrer in Zeiten des Umbruchs: Gerhard Anschütz (1867–1948), in: ZNR 20 (1998) S. 28–48
 Walter Pauly, "Gerhard Anschütz. An Introduction", in: Arthur Jacobson and Bernhard Schlink (Ed.): Weimar, A Jurisprudence of Crisis, 2001

References
 

1867 births
1948 deaths
Jurists from Saxony-Anhalt
Writers from Halle (Saale)
People from the Province of Saxony
Academic staff of the University of Tübingen
Academic staff of Heidelberg University
Academic staff of the Humboldt University of Berlin
20th-century jurists